Viktor Bondarenko may refer to:
 Viktor Bondarenko (football manager) (born 1949), Russian football coach and former player 
 Viktor Bondarenko (politician) (born 1967), Ukrainian politician
 Viktor Bondarenko (coach), Ukrainian trainer and father of high jumper Bohdan Bondarenko